Geochang Shin clan is one of the Korean clans. Their Bon-gwan is in Geochang County, South Gyeongsang Province. According to the research held in 2015, the number of Geochang Shin clan's member was 51,153. Their founder was  who was a Kaifeng people in Song dynasty and was naturalized Goryeo during Munjong of Goryeo's reign.

See also 
 Korean clan names of foreign origin

References

External links 
 

 
Sin clans
Korean clan names of Chinese origin